Belkas Sports Club is a football club based in Belqas, Egypt. They are currently members of the Third Division, Group 10 – Port Said.

History
The club was established in 1948. They were promoted to the Egyptian Premier League at the end of the 1974–75 season. Placed in Group A, they finished second-from-bottom of the division in 1975–76 and were relegated back to the second tier.

Belkas were relegated to the third tier after finishing in the relegation zone in 2014–15.

References

Football clubs in Egypt
Association football clubs established in 1948
1948 establishments in Egypt